The  is a women's professional wrestling championship promoted by the Japanese World Wonder Ring Stardom promotion. Though the Japanese name of the title translates to "SWA World Championship", the title is also being internationally referred to as the "SWA Undisputed World Women's Championship".

Title history 
Promotions in the alliance include Stardom, British Empire Wrestling (BEW), the French Association Biterroise de Catch (ABC), the Mexican Women Wrestling Stars (WWS) and the Spanish Revolution Championship Wrestling (RCW). Like most professional wrestling championships, the title is won as a result of a scripted match. The rules of the championship state that only wrestlers from countries other than the reigning champion can challenge it. For example, as long as the title had a Japanese champion, no other Japanese wrestler could challenge for it.

Reigns 

Io Shirai was the inaugural champion. Toni Storm has the longest reign at 612 days while also having the most defenses, with 15 times. Bea Priestley has the shortest at 43 days. Syuri is the oldest champion at 31 years old, while Storm is the youngest at 20 years old.

The championship is currently vacated, as the previous title holder Mayu Iwatni relinquished the title on November 3, 2022 at Hiroshima Goddess Festival in order to focus on the IWGP Women's Championship.

See also
World Wonder Ring Stardom
World of Stardom Championship

Footnotes

References

External links 
 World Wonder Ring Stardom's official website

World Wonder Ring Stardom championships
Women's professional wrestling championships